Ahmed Hassan Farag (born 9 June 1982) is an Egyptian footballer, who plays in the position of a striker, and currently plays for El Gouna in the Egyptian Premier League. In January 2010, he signed a 6-month loan deal with Ghazl El-Mehalla.

References

External links

1982 births
Living people
Egyptian footballers
Egypt international footballers
Association football forwards
Ittihad El Shorta SC players